Anthony Michael Collins (born 1960) is an Irish lawyer who is an Advocate General of the European Court of Justice. He was a judge of the General Court of the European Union between 2013 and 2021.

Early life and education 
Collins was born in 1960 USA. He attended Trinity College Dublin from where graduated with a BA in Legal Science in 1984. He attended the King's Inns to study to become a barrister.

He was involved in student organisations, acting as general secretary of the Organising Bureau of European School Student Unions between 1977 and 1984, general secretary of the Irish Union of School Students from 1977 to 1979 and was vice president of the Council of European National Youth Committees between 1979 and 1981. He was also a member of the Labour Party.

Legal career 
He was called to the bar in 1986 and became a senior counsel in 2003. His legal practice encompassed European Union law and administrative law.

His involvement with the European Court of Justice began in 1990 where he served as référendaire to Irish judges Tom O'Higgins and John L. Murray. He returned to practice in 1997.

He is the co-author of a legal text Civil Proceedings and the State and edited the Irish Journal of European Law between 1992 and 2001. He is an adjunct professor of University College Cork and a bencher of the King's Inns.

Judicial career

General Court 
Collins was nominated to the General Court of the European Union by the Government of Ireland in May 2013, replacing Kevin O'Higgins as the Irish judge on the court. He was reappointed on 1 September 2019 for a further six-year term. He has held the position of President of the Third Chamber of the General Court.

In 2016, Collins was elected as president of the Eighth Chamber. In 2019, he was elected as president of the Third Chamber.

Advocate General 
In April 2021, Ireland's serving Advocate General of the European Court of Justice Gerard Hogan was nominated to the Supreme Court of Ireland. The Irish government put in place a panel of Paul Gallagher, Nial Fennelly and former ambassador Marie Cross to nominate a person to serve the remainder of Hogan's term to 8 October 2024. His nomination was announced on 28 May 2021. His appointment was ratified by the European Council in September 2021. He will serve between 7 October 2021 and 6 October 2024.

References 

Living people
1960 births
Alumni of Trinity College Dublin
21st-century Irish judges
20th-century Irish lawyers
Alumni of King's Inns
General Court (European Union) judges
Advocates General of the European Court of Justice